Frederic Gregory Mather (11 August 1844, in Cleveland, Ohio – 30 August 1925, in Stamford, Connecticut) was a United States journalist.

Biography
He was the son of banker Samuel Holmes Mather (1813–1894) and Emily Worthington Gregory (1815–1900). He attended Cleveland High School, and graduated from Dartmouth College in 1867. For a time he worked and studied law in Cleveland, but did not practice, instead choosing scientific and literary pursuits. In 1874 he became managing editor of the Times at Binghamton, New York, and in 1875 editor-in-chief of the Republican in the same city, but resigned the place in 1879. He wrote editorials for the Albany Evening Journal in 1880, and then became the resident Albany correspondent of several newspapers. He frequently contributed articles to periodicals, chiefly on historical, economic, and scientific subjects.

Family
In 1871, he married Cornelia Heyer Olcutt (c.1847-1874).  They had one daughter.  He later married Alice Evelyn Yeager (b. 1853) in 1880.

Notes

References
 
 

Attribution

External links
  An article on his father.

1844 births
1925 deaths
19th-century American male writers
19th-century American newspaper editors
19th-century journalists
20th-century American male writers
20th-century American newspaper editors
20th-century journalists
American male journalists
Dartmouth College alumni
Editors of New York (state) newspapers
Journalists from New York (state)
Writers from Albany, New York
Writers from Binghamton, New York